Bog orchid is a common name for several orchids and may refer to:

 Habenaria, a widespread genus of orchids
 Hammarbya paludosa (or Malaxis paludosa), a Northern Hemisphere species of orchid